Lon Worth Evans (December 25, 1911 – December 11, 1992) was a professional American football player who played offensive lineman for five seasons for the Green Bay Packers in the National Football League. He was inducted into the Green Bay Packers Hall of Fame in 1978.

Evans was born in Fort Worth, Texas and attended Polytechnic High School. He then played at Texas Christian University for coach Francis Schmidt. As a senior in 1932, Evans helped the TCU Horned Frogs to a Southwest Conference championship.

Following his NFL career, Evans became sheriff of Tarrant County, Texas. Nicknamed "Purple Lawman", he held the county's top law enforcement job from 1960 until his retirement in 1984. He was interred at Fort Worth's cemetery Greenwood Memorial Park along with Ray Renfro.

External links 
 

1911 births
1992 deaths
People from Fort Worth, Texas
American football offensive tackles
TCU Horned Frogs football players
Green Bay Packers players